The Liquor Licensing and Compliance Division is a division of the Maine State Police, responsible for licensing the manufacture, importation, storage, transportation and sale of all liquor and enforcing compliance with tax collection on malt liquor and wine.

See also
Alcohol laws of Maine

State alcohol agencies of the United States
Liquor Licensing